LGA 775 (land grid array 775), also known as Socket T, is an Intel desktop CPU socket. Unlike PGA CPU sockets, such as its predecessor Socket 478, LGA 775 has no socket holes; instead, it has 775 protruding pins which touch contact points on the underside of the processor (CPU).

The socket had an unusually long life span, lasting 7 years until the last processors supporting it ceased production in 2011. The socket was superseded by the LGA 1156 (Socket H) and LGA 1366 (Socket B) sockets.

LGA 775 processors 

(some of the processors listed here might not work on newer Intel based chipsets)  

 Pentium 4
 Pentium 4 Extreme Edition
 Pentium D
 Celeron/Celeron D
 Pentium Dual-Core
 Pentium Extreme Edition
 Core 2 Duo/Core 2 Quad

Heatsink design 
For LGA 775, the distance between the screw-holes for the heatsink is 72 mm. Such heat-sinks are not interchangeable with heatsinks for sockets that have a distance of 75 mm, such as LGA 1156, LGA 1155, LGA 1150, LGA 1151 and LGA 1200.

Chipsets

LGA 775 was the last Intel socket for desktops for which third-party companies manufactured chipsets. Nvidia was the last third-party manufacturer of LGA 775 chipsets (its final product was MCP7A family, marketed as GeForce 9300/9400, launched in October 2008), as other third-parties discontinued their products earlier. All chipsets for superseding sockets were exclusively designed and manufactured by Intel, a practice later also adopted by AMD when they first launched APUs in 2011 (Socket AM3+ processors, also first launched in 2011, were usually paired with AMD chipsets, but some motherboards using third-party chipsets were also manufactured, usually with Nvidia chipsets, as Socket AM3+ design directly derived from earlier Socket AM3 design).

Intel

Core 2 Chipsets 

Lakeport: 945PL / 945P / 945G / 945GC / 945GZ / 955X / 946PL / 946GZ P
Broadwater: i955X / i946 / 946GZ / PL / 965 / i975 / Q965 / P965 / G965 / Q963 / i975X
Bearlake: X35 / P35 / Q35 / G35 / P33 / G33 / Q33 / P31 / G31 / X38 / X48
Eaglelake: P45 / P43 / G45 / G43 / G41 / B43 / Q43 / Q45945PLS3

SiS 

 SiS 649
 649FX
 655
 656
 656FX
 662
 671
 671FX
 671DX
 672

VIA 

 PT800
 PM800
 PT880
 PM880
 P4M800
 P4M800 Pro
 PT880 Pro
 PT880 Ultra
 PT894
 PT894 Pro
 P4M890
 PT890
 P4M900

PT880 Pro also supports AGP and PCI-Express at the same time, but only one port can be used at a time.

ATI 

 ATI Radeon Xpress 200
 ATI Radeon Xpress 1250
 ATI CrossFire Xpress 3200

Nvidia 

 nForce4 Ultra
 nForce4 SLI XE
 nForce4 SLI;
 nForce4 SLI X16
 nForce 570 SLI
 nForce 590 SLI
 nForce 610i
 nForce 620i
 nForce 630i
 nForce 650i Ultra
 nForce 650i SLI
 nForce 680i LT SLI
 nForce 680i SLI
 nForce 730i
 nForce 740i SLI
 nForce 750i SLI
 nForce 760i SLI
 nForce 780i SLI
 nForce 790i SLI
 GeForce 9300
 GeForce 9400

Improvements in heat dissipation

The force from the load plate ensures that the processor is completely level, giving the CPU's upper surface optimal contact with the heat sink or cold-water block fixed onto the top of the CPU to carry away the heat generated by the CPU. This socket also introduces a new method of connecting the heat dissipation interface to the chip surface and motherboard. With LGA 775, the heat dissipation interface is connected directly to the motherboard on four points, compared with the two connections of the Socket 370 and the "clamshell" four-point connection of the Socket 478. This was done to avoid the reputed danger of the heat sinks/fans of pre-built computers falling off in transit. LGA 775 was announced to have better heat dissipation properties than the Socket 478 it was designed to replace, but the Prescott core CPUs (in their early incarnations) ran much hotter than the previous Northwood-core Pentium 4 CPUs, and this initially neutralized the benefits of better heat transfer. However, the later Core 2 processors run at much lower temperatures than the Prescott CPUs they replaced.

Processors with lower TDP and clock speeds only used Thermal Interface Compound in between the die and the integrated heat spreader (IHS), while processors with higher TDP and clock speeds have the die soldered directly to the IHS, allowing for better heat transfer between the CPU and the integrated heat spreader.

LGA 775 mechanical load limits

All LGA 775 processors have the following mechanical maximum load limits which should not be exceeded during heat sink assembly, shipping conditions, or standard use. Load above those limits could crack the processor die and make it unusable.

The transition to the LGA packaging has lowered those load limits, which are smaller than the load limits of Socket 478 processors but they are bigger than Socket 370, Socket 423 and Socket A processors, which were fragile. They are large enough to ensure that processors will not crack.

LGA 775 compatibility
Compatibility is quite variable, as earlier chipsets (Intel 915 and below) tend to support only single core NetBurst Pentium 4 and Celeron CPUs at an FSB of 533/800 MT/s.

Intermediate chipsets (e.g. Intel 945) commonly support both single core Pentium 4-based CPUs as well as dual core Pentium D processors. Some motherboards using the 945 chipset could be given a BIOS upgrade to support 65nm Core-based processors. Other chipsets have varying levels of CPU support, generally following the release of contemporary CPUs, as LGA 775 CPU support is a complicated mixture of chipset capability, voltage regulator limitations and BIOS support. For example, the newer Q45 chipset does not support NetBurst-based CPUs such as the Pentium 4, Pentium D, Pentium Extreme Edition, and Celeron D.

Virtualization capabilities 
Some Core 2 and other Socket 775 processors are capable of hardware-accelerated virtualization. However, more recent hypervisors might not be compatible with these CPUs because they lack support for Extended Page Tables.

See also
 List of Intel processors
 List of Intel Pentium 4 processors
 List of Intel Core 2 processors
 List of Intel Xeon processors

References

External links

LGA 0775